Jangala may refer to:
Jangala (charity), British charity providing internet access to disadvantaged people
Jangala Desh or Jangladesh, historic region of Rajasthan, India
Sweet-Tooth Jangala, a character in the PlayStation 2 port of the 2008 racing video game Speed Racer: The Videogame